America 2 Night is the continuation of the talk-show parody series Fernwood 2 Night, broadcast weeknights from April to July 1978. As on  Fernwood, Martin Mull portrayed host Barth Gimble and Fred Willard appeared as sidekick/announcer Jerry Hubbard. Frank De Vol also returned as bandleader Happy Kyne.

Premise
The setting of the show was moved from the fictional Fernwood, Ohio, to the fictional "Quad-City" area of Alta Coma, El Tijo, Alta Luna and the City of Merchandise in Southern California. According to Hubbard's announcement at the beginning of every show, Alta Coma was "the unfinished furniture capital of the world". This new Southern California setting made it more plausible for celebrities to appear on the show as themselves. Among the celebrities who appeared as guests are Charlton Heston,
Vincent Price, Carol Burnett, Burt Lancaster, Steve Allen, Milton Berle, Paul Lynde, Rita Moreno, Rob Reiner, Peter Frampton, Mark Hamill, Gary Coleman, Sherman Hemsley, Billy Crystal and Anne Murray. In the final episode, Mull and Willard guested as themselves.

America 2 Night was broadcast on the fictional UBS network, located on the UBS Broadcast Mall, whose logo featured an ear (a spoof of the CBS "Eye" logo) and whose slogan was "We put U before the BS".

In 2001, Martin Mull and Fred Willard reprised their roles of Barth and Jerry in a stage appearance and retrospective at the US Comedy Arts Festival in Aspen, Colorado.

Recurring characters
 William W.D. 'Bud' Prize (Kenneth Mars)
 Susan Cloud (Susan Eliott)
 Tony Rolletti (Bill Kirchenbauer)
 Virgil Simms (Jim Varney)
 Jason Shine (Robin Williams)
 Chuck Emmitt Saugis (Paul Willson)

Syndication
Repeats of Fernwood/America 2 Night were broadcast on Nick at Nite from 1990 to 1993 and TV Land in 2002. The program has never been officially released on home video in any format.

See also
 List of late night network TV programs

References

External links
 

1978 American television series debuts
1978 American television series endings
1970s American satirical television series
1970s American sitcoms
English-language television shows
First-run syndicated television programs in the United States
Television series about television
Television shows set in California
American television spin-offs
Television series by Sony Pictures Television
Television series created by Norman Lear